Microbe: The Anatomical Adventure is a 1982 video game published by Synergistic Software for the Apple II.

Gameplay
Microbe is a game in which a microscopic crew must journey through the body starting from the leg, through various organs and the connecting veins and arteries, to the brain to find out what is wrong with the patient.

Reception
Tom Cleaver reviewed the game for Computer Gaming World, and stated that "I thoroughly recommend Microbe to gamers of every stripe for the enjoyment it provides, and I recommend it to everyone else for its educational content."

See also
 Fantastic Voyage

References

External links
Review in Softalk
Review in Electronic Games
Review in Family Computing
Review in Softline
Review in Apple Orchard
Review in Windfall
Review in Home Software Guild catalog
Review in Compute!
Review in "Biological science : a molecular approach"

1982 video games
Apple II games
Apple II-only games
Human body in popular culture
Medical video games
Shoot 'em ups
Simulation video games
Synergistic Software games
Video games about microbes
Video games about size change
Video games developed in the United States